Enno Hallek (born 1931) is a Swedish artist and professor. He and his family moved to Sweden from Soviet-occupied Estonia as refugees in 1943. He was educated at the Kungliga Konsthögskolan, and had his first solo exhibition in 1963 at Konstnärshuset in Stockholm. He was a professor of arts at the Kungliga Konsthögsskolan between 1981 and 1991. Along with Åke Hallarp, he designed the Stadions tunnelbanestation, the Stadium subway station in Stockholm.

Early years
Hallek grew up in Rohuküla, Estonia, where his father worked as a fisherman. The family fled the Soviet occupation of Estonia on its fishing trawler in 1943 and arrived at Torsö on Listerlandet in Blekinge, Sweden. The family settled on Torsö and continued their fishing business there. During the 1940s, Hallek took courses in drawing via correspondence, and after winning a drawing competition at school he received the opportunity to travel to Paris. Hallek moved to Stockholm in 1950 and began attending Signe Barth's school of the arts. He attended the Kungliga Konsthögskolan from 1953 to 1958.

Artistry

Hallek had his first solo exhibition in 1963, and his work has been regularly exhibited since. He has claimed to be inspired by the rainbows and sunsets he experienced while, as a child, frequently living on his family's fishing trawler. During the 1970s and 1980s, he worked on hybrids between sculptures and paintings. In 1989, Hallek returned to Estonia for the first time since becoming a refugee, and has since held several exhibitions in his birth country.

Since 1990, he has worked on a series of paintings called "bärbara solnedgångar", or "portable sunsets". The paintings consist of two half-circles that have been sawed out of plywood, tied with strings, and had a handle attached to them. In late 2008, a series of these works were exhibited at the Moderna Museet in Stockholm.

References

External links 

1931 births
Living people
People from Haapsalu
Swedish artists
Estonian emigrants to Sweden
Estonian World War II refugees
Recipients of the Order of the White Star, 5th Class